This article lists the presidents of Guinea, since the country gained independence from France in 1958 (after rejecting to join the French Community in a constitutional referendum).

List

Key
Political parties

Other factions

Symbols

 Elected unopposed
† Died in office

Officeholders

Notes

Timeline

Latest election

See also
Guinea 
List of prime ministers of Guinea
List of colonial governors of French Guinea
Politics of Guinea 
Lists of office-holders

References

External links
 Government
 Official site of the Guinean government
Guinea's state structure

Guinea
Presidents
1958 establishments in Guinea